"Peace or Violence" is a 2010 song by Belgian singer Stromae, released on 31 May as the fourth promo-single for his album Cheese.

Track listing
Peace or Violence (3:08)

Charts

Weekly charts

Year-end charts

References

External links
 

2010 singles
2010 songs
Stromae songs
Eurodance songs
Songs written by Stromae